Behind Monastery Walls is a 1952 West German drama film directed by Harald Reinl and starring Olga Tschechowa, Philip Dorn and Katharina Mayberg. It takes place in a priory and is sometimes known by the alternative title of The Unholy Intruders. It was shot at the Bavaria Studios in Munich. The film's sets were designed by the art directors Robert Herlth and Gottfried Will.

Synopsis
Thomas Holinka, a disillusioned veteran of the Second World War, returns from a prisoner of war camp. Having no home, he chooses to live in an seemingly abandoned priory. However, the nuns then return to the site, leading to conflict over his wayward lifestyle.

Cast
 Olga Tschechowa as Priorin
 Philip Dorn as Thomas Holinka
 Katharina Mayberg as Kathrin
 Dorothea Wieck as Subpriorin
 Margit Saad as Schwester Romana
 Margarete Haagen as Prokuratorin
 Walter Janssen as Dr. Riedinger
 Hedwig Bleibtreu
 Harald Holberg as Joschi Panek
 Hanna Ralph as Generaloberin
 Peter Fischer as Peter, 4 Jahre alt
 Jochen Hauer as Oberwachtmeister
 Sibylle von Gymnich as Lektorin
 Anton Färber as Bürgermeister
 Lisa Helwig
 Bertha Picard
 Max Greger as Bandleader of a tanzorchester
 Münchner Philharmoniker
 Teddy Turai
 Rieve von Kortens

References

Bibliography 
 James Robert Parish & Kingsley Canham. Film Directors Guide: Western Europe. Scarecrow Press, 1976.

External links 
 

1952 films
West German films
German drama films
1952 drama films
1950s German-language films
Films directed by Harald Reinl
Films set in monasteries
German black-and-white films
Films shot at Bavaria Studios
1950s German films